The 2016 Atlanta Falcons season was the franchise's 51st season in the National Football League (NFL) and the second under head coach Dan Quinn. It also marked the team's 25th and final season playing their home games at the Georgia Dome, as the Falcons moved into the new Mercedes-Benz Stadium in 2017. The Falcons won the NFC South for the first time since 2012 and improved on their 8–8 record from 2015, going 11–5 and earning the second seed in the NFC playoffs. Quarterback Matt Ryan was named the 2016 NFL MVP. The Falcons scored 540 points, the most in the NFL for 2016 and 8th all-time. The team scored fewer than 23 points only once all season: a 24–15 loss to the Eagles.

The Falcons defeated the Seattle Seahawks 36–20 in the Divisional Round to advance to the NFC Championship Game for the first time since 2012. In the NFC Championship game, they defeated the Green Bay Packers, 44–21, to advance to their second Super Bowl appearance in franchise history; they had competed in Super Bowl XXXIII 18 years earlier. In Super Bowl LI, the Falcons faced the New England Patriots, and built up a 28–3 lead midway through the third quarter. However, the Patriots subsequently scored 25 unanswered points, forcing overtime for the first time in Super Bowl history, where they went on to win 34–28.

Free agents

Draft

Notes
 The Falcons did not select a player in the fifth round:
 The team forfeited their fifth-round selection as the punishment for piping artificial crowd noise into the Georgia Dome during the 2013 and 2014 seasons. If the Falcons receive multiple fifth-round selections, the team will forfeit its first fifth-round selection;
 The Falcons traded their sixth-round selection (No. 193) to the Tennessee Titans in exchange for guard Andy Levitre and a future undisclosed selection. They subsequently acquired Pick No. 195 from the New York Jets.

Staff

Final roster

Preseason

Schedule

The Falcons preseason opponents and schedule were announced on April 7, 2016.

Regular season

Schedule

Game summaries

Week 1: vs. Tampa Bay Buccaneers

With the loss, the Falcons started their season 0–1 for the first time since 2013.

Week 2: at Oakland Raiders

With the win, the Falcons improved to 1–1.

Week 3: at New Orleans Saints

With the win, the Falcons improved to 2–1.

Week 4: vs. Carolina Panthers

Matt Ryan and Julio Jones made Falcons team history as Ryan exploded to 503 passing yards and Jones caught twelve passes for 300 yards and a touchdown, becoming the first quarterback-receiver duo to break 500 passing yards and 300 receiving yards in club history and the first such tandem in the NFL's Super Bowl era. Cam Newton was knocked out of the game with a concussion incurred on a two-point conversion run.
With the win, the Falcons improved to 3–1.

Week 5: at Denver Broncos

With the win, the Falcons improved to 4–1 for the first time since 2010.

Week 6: at Seattle Seahawks

With the loss, the Falcons dropped to 4–2.

Week 7: vs. San Diego Chargers

The Falcons blew a 17-point lead and lost to the Chargers, 33-30. They wore their black throwback uniforms for this game. With the game tied at 30–30, a missed 58-yarder by Matt Bryant forced the game into overtime. The Falcons received the ball first in overtime but turned the ball over on downs after failing to convert a fourth down. Josh Lambo kicked a 42-yard field goal in overtime to seal a 33–30 victory for the Chargers.
With the brutal loss, the Falcons dropped to 4–3 for the first time since 2009. This is the final game the Falcons played against the San Diego-based Chargers.

Week 8: vs. Green Bay Packers

With the win, the Falcons improved to 5–3.

Week 9: at Tampa Bay Buccaneers

Despite Mike Evans finishing the game with 11 receptions for 150 yards and two scores, the Falcons still managed to beat Tampa Bay on the road, 43–28. With the win, the Falcons improved to 6–3.

Week 10: at Philadelphia Eagles

With the loss, the Falcons dropped to 6–4.

Week 12: vs. Arizona Cardinals

With the impressive win, the Falcons improved to 7–4.

Week 13: vs. Kansas City Chiefs

The Falcons trailed 27–16 going into the fourth quarter, and took the lead through a 1-yard touchdown run by Devonta Freeman, followed by a 5-yard pass from Matt Ryan to Aldrick Robinson. Having failed on the two-point conversion following Freeman's touchdown, they tried for two points again after Robinson's catch with the aim of securing a three-point lead going into the last four minutes of the game; however, Chiefs safety Eric Berry intercepted Ryan's attempted pass and returned it all the way to the Atlanta end zone for a defensive two-point conversion that gave Kansas City a 29–28 lead that they were able to defend for the remainder of the game. With the loss, the Falcons dropped to 7–5 for the first time since 2011.

Week 14: at Los Angeles Rams

With the win, the Falcons improved to 8–5.

Week 15: vs. San Francisco 49ers

With the win, the Falcons improved to 9–5.

Week 16: at Carolina Panthers

With the win, the Falcons improved to 10–5.

Week 17: vs. New Orleans Saints

This was the Falcons' final regular season game at the Georgia Dome. With the win, the Falcons finished their season at 11–5.

Postseason

Schedule

Game summaries

NFC Divisional Playoffs: vs. (3) Seattle Seahawks

After coming off a first round bye, the Falcons hosted the Seahawks in the divisional round of the playoffs. The Falcons trailed midway through the first quarter when the Seahawks went up 7–0 from a 7-yard touchdown pass from Russell Wilson to Jimmy Graham. In the second quarter, Atlanta tied the game 7–7 on a 7-yard touchdown pass from Matt Ryan to Julio Jones. On the next Seattle drive, the Seahawks took a 10–7 lead with a 33-yard field goal from Steven Hauschka.

The next Falcons drive ended in a three and out. On the ensuing punt, Seattle's Devin Hester returned the punt 80-yards to Atlanta's 7-yard line. However, that punt return was called back on a penalty, forcing Seattle to start at its own 7-yard line. After Thomas Rawls was tackled for a 3-yard loss, Wilson attempted to drop back to pass. However, while doing so, Wilson tripped over Rees Odhiambo's foot and was tackled in the end zone, leading to a safety for Atlanta. Receiving the ball following the safety, Atlanta took its first lead of the game on a 35-yard field goal from Matt Bryant. After forcing Seattle to Punt, the Falcons took a 19–10 lead going into halftime on a 14-yard touchdown pass to Tevin Coleman.

Atlanta remained ahead for the rest of the game, eventually beating Seattle 36–20. With the win, the Falcons improved their record to 12–5. Matt Ryan threw for 338 yards and 3 touchdowns and improved his playoff record to 2–4, with both of his playoff wins (up to that point) coming against the Seahawks. This was speculated to be the last NFL game ever in the Georgia Dome, but when the fourth-seeded Green Bay Packers upset the top-seeded Dallas Cowboys in the other Divisional Playoff the next day, Atlanta was named the host of the NFC Championship Game, the last ever game in the Dome.

NFC Championship Game: vs. (4) Green Bay Packers

This was the Falcons' final game ever in the Georgia Dome after 25 seasons, as the team moved into the Mercedes-Benz Stadium in 2017. The Falcons never trailed in the game, scoring 31 unanswered points until Rodgers threw a touchdown pass halfway through the third quarter to give Green Bay its first points. The Falcons won 44–21 to advance to the Super Bowl for the first time since their 1998 season, as well as the second time in franchise history. Matt Ryan had a big game, throwing 4 touchdown passes and running for another score. His 392 yards were the second-most ever thrown in a Championship Game, only behind his 396 yards in the 2012 NFC Championship Games versus the San Francisco 49ers. Julio Jones was another huge part of the Falcons win, with 9 catches, 180 yards and 2 touchdowns.  One of the scores came on a 73-yard tackle-breaking catch. The Falcons' defense held fellow MVP-candidate Rodgers and his offense in check most of the game, forcing several hurries and drops. They also forced 2 turnovers, one was a fumble that was forced and then recovered by Jalen Collins on Packers Aaron Ripkowski, and the other one of them coming on a 3rd and 21 pass by Rodgers, that Ricardo Allen intercepted.

Super Bowl LI: vs. New England Patriots

The Falcons led the game 28-3 into the third quarter before the Patriots scored 25 unanswered points to tie at 28 all, and create the first Super Bowl game to go into overtime. The Patriots won the coin-toss and won the game via a James White touchdown.  This ended the Falcons' season record at 13–6.

Standings

Division

Conference

References

External links

 

Atlanta
Atlanta Falcons seasons
Atlanta Falcons
NFC South championship seasons
National Football Conference championship seasons